(Kingston upon) Hull City Council is the governing body for the unitary authority and city of Kingston upon Hull. It was created in 1972 as the successor to the Corporation of (Kingston upon) Hull, which was also known as Hull Corporation and founded in 1440 by royal charter.

Structure

From 2002 until 2018 Hull City Council consisted of 59 councillors which are elected from 23 wards, each ward returning either two or three councillors. Following a review, in 2017, by the Local Government Boundary Commission this was reduced to 57 councillors from 21 wards effective from the 2018 elections.
The council has several subcomponents with differing responsibilities:
Cabinet: The Cabinet makes most day-to-day decisions. It consists of the council leader, council deputy leader, and eight other councillors (called Portfolio Holders), all elected by the full council.
Cabinet Committees: The Cabinet appoints councillors to Cabinet Committees to handle specific responsibilities, such as granting of contracts above a certain monetary value.
Task Groups: The Cabinet can form temporary units called Task Groups, usually to deal with specific issues. These can contain members from outside the council, such as persons expert in the issue or members of the public.
Area committees: These committees are responsible for different geographic areas of the city. They advise the Council and perform certain duties assigned. The Area Committees hold public area forums, in which citizens can participate directly.
Regulatory Committees: Required by law or by the nature of the function for which they are responsible. These functions include planning, licensing, standards, school government, and civic affairs.
Overview and Scrutiny Committees: Designed to allow citizens greater say in council oversight, these committees hold public hearings into issues of local concern.

Political composition

Until 2002, with the exception of the period 1969–71, the council had been led by Labour since 1945. They again led the council as a minority administration between 2003 and 2006. Between the 2006 election and 2011 election Hull City Council was led by a Liberal Democrat administration, originally as a minority administration. The Liberal Democrats first gained overall control of the council after the 2007 election. In the 2011 election Labour regained control of the council following the collapse of the Liberal Democrat vote. In the 2012 election  Labour increased the number of seats they held. In the 2014 election two Labour councillors formed an "Independent Labour Group" in protest against their own party's budget plans, off-setting the two seats gained by Labour in the election. In the 2018 election all seats were contested because of boundary changes and the Liberal Democrat vote rose gaining seats on Labour who held on to control, with their worst result since 2010. The 2019 election saw just 2 seats change hands leaving the composition of the council unchanged. Elections in 2020 were postponed for a year due to the COVID-19 pandemic. The 2021 election saw Labour lose a seat, while the Liberal Democrats gained two. On 3 March 2022, Labour councillor Julia Conner defected to the Liberal Democrats, reducing the Labour majority to one. Two weeks later, it was announced that another Labour Councillor, Sean Chaytor, would be standing as an independent candidate against Labour in the upcoming 2022 local elections. The Liberal Democrats won overall control of the City Council in the 2022 local elections to end ten years of Labour rule.

Councillors

See also
Hull City Council elections
List of Mayors of Kingston upon Hull

Notes

References

External links 
 http://www.hull.gov.uk

 
Unitary authority councils of England
Leader and cabinet executives
Local education authorities in England
Local authorities in the East Riding of Yorkshire
Billing authorities in England